709 Fringilla is a minor planet orbiting the Sun.

References

External links 
 
 

000709
Discoveries by Joseph Helffrich
Named minor planets
000709
19110203